Chowilla may refer to:

Chowilla, South Australia, a locality
Chowilla Dam, a cancelled dam project in Australia
Chowilla floodplain, a flood plain in South Australia
Chowilla Game Reserve, a protected area in South Australia	
Chowilla Regional Reserve, a protected area in South Australia